

12th Air Corps (XII. Fliegerkorps) was formed 1 August 1941 in Zeist from the Stab of the 1. Nachtjagd-Division and was redesignated as I. Jagdkorps on 15 September 1943. The unit was subordinated to Luftwaffenbefehlshaber Mitte.

Commanding officers
 General Josef Kammhuber, 9 August 1941 – 15 September 1943

See also
 Luftwaffe Organization

References

A012
Military units and formations established in 1941
Military units and formations disestablished in 1943